Bremse was built as an artillery training ship of the Nazi German  with a secondary function as a test bed for new marine diesel engines later installed in German . During World War II, she operated as an escort ship until her sinking in September 1941.

History
Bremse was commissioned on June 14, 1933 and attached to the artillery training school at Kiel, to replace older predecessors. In 1933 she underwent repairs and a complete refit; her mast was shortened to improve stability and her artillery director was removed.

In 1939, the ship was used in the film Der letzte Apell as the British scout cruiser Amphion; two additional dummy funnels were added.

Wartime career 
She then returned to the artillery school in Kiel until March 1940.

In April 1940, during Operation Weserübung, Bremse participated in the attack on Bergen. She was shelled by Norwegian coastal artillery and hit by two 21 cm rounds; she was subsequently repaired in Stavanger. Later, on November 1 Bremse was accidentally rammed by the steamer Donau off Bergen, suffering minor damage.

In June 1941, Bremse was sent back to Kiel for escort duty. On July 30 she was bombed by British Albacore torpedo bombers and Fulmar fighters from the aircraft carrier  but escaped unharmed.

Sinking 
On September 6, 1941, in Hammerfjord, while escorting the troop transports  and Barcelona, Bremse was intercepted and attacked by the British cruisers HMS Nigeria and Aurora. Bremse was able to draw the cruisers away from the transports, so that they could escape, but she was sunk when rammed by Nigeria and cut in half. (Some sources give an alternative outcome, reporting that the Nigeria was damaged by a mine and Bremse sunk by gunfire.) 160 men, over half of her crew, died.

References 

 Bremse at german-navy.de

Minelayers of the Reichsmarine
Ships of the Reichsmarine
Ships built in Wilhelmshaven
1932 ships
Training ships of the Kriegsmarine
Minelayers of the Kriegsmarine
World War II auxiliary ships of Germany
Maritime incidents in September 1941
World War II shipwrecks in the Arctic Ocean